Ardian Rexhepi (born 16 August 1993) is a Swedish footballer of Kosovo Albanian descent who most recently played for IK Brage as a midfielder.

Career
Starting his career in Hyltebruks IF, he moved to Halmstads BK youth system in 2006. He played in several youth competitions for the club and during his participation in Gothia Cup he was spotted by scouts from Atalanta and was invited for a trial, however failed to gain a contract.

Returning to Halmstads BK, new coach Josep Clotet Ruiz had him participate in several pre-season matches before elevating him to the senior team prior the start of the season, eventually making his league debut against BK Häcken on 21 June 2011.

References

External links
 
 (archive)
 (archive) 

1993 births
Living people
Swedish footballers
Association football midfielders
Allsvenskan players
Halmstads BK players
Swedish people of Kosovan descent
Association football defenders